All This Intimacy is a 2006 play written by American playwright Rajiv Joseph that premiered at Second Stage Theater.

Plot
Ty, in one week, impregnates his ex-girlfriend Jen, his married next door neighbor Maureen, and his university student Becca.

Production history
All This Intimacy, produced by the Second Stage Theater, opened at on July 27, 2006. Directed by Giovanna Sardelli, set design David Newell, costume design Amy Clark, lighting design Rie Ono, and sound design Bart Fasbender. The show starred Thomas Sadoski (Ty), Gretchen Egolf (Jen), Adam Green (Seth), Amy Landecker (Maureen), Kate Nowlin (Franny), and Krysten Ritter (Becca).

Reviews
Neil Genzlinger of the New York Times said of the original production, that it's "almost certainly unchallenged in the creative use of spermatozoa as a scenic motif." Marilyn Stasio of Variety, in a less glowing review, wrote that it's " a comedy that can’t decide how funny it wants to be".

References

External links
 

2006 plays
Off-Broadway plays
Plays set in New York City